Manikpara is a small village in Jhargram (community development block) in Jhargram subdivision of Paschim Medinipur district in West Bengal, India.

Manikpara is a developing small city. It is situated near Sardiha station. Its geographical co-ordinates  are 22° 22' 0" North, 87° 7' 0" East.

Education
Vivekananda Satavarshiki Mahavidyalaya was established in 1964 at Manikpara. It is affiliated to Vidyasagar University. It offers courses in Bengali, Santali, English, Sanskrit, history, political science, philosophy, economics, commerce, physics, chemistry and mathematics.

References

Villages in Paschim Medinipur district